Knight of Malta may refer to:

a member of the Knights Hospitaller after 1530
a member of the Sovereign Military Order of Malta after 1822
a rank within the Knights Templar (Freemasonry)
The Knight of Malta, a Jacobean-era stage play
, a cargo liner

See also
History of Malta under the Order of Saint John